Across the Plains is a 1939 American Western film directed by Spencer Gordon Bennet and starring Addison Randall, Frank Yaconelli, and Joyce Bryant. Written by Robert Emmett Tansey, the film is about two brothers who are separated when they are young and who meet again as adults, one good and one bad.

Plot 
A gang of outlaws attack a wagon train and orphan two young brothers: Jack and Jimmy. The outlaws take Jimmy with them, while Jack is adopted by an Indian tribe. When they grow up, Jack (Randall) is protecting a shipment of gold, while Jimmy (Moore), now known as the "Kansas Kid," works with the gang of outlaws to steal it. The two clash in the attempted robbery, but before the two men can kill each other, Buckskin, the old wagon train master from their childhood, reveals their true relationship to one another. Jimmy discovers one of the outlaws was murdered by their parents, and he crosses sides. An exciting final shootout ensues between the two brothers and the outlaws, and Jimmy is killed by Gordon's gang. Jimmy regrets to his brother about his past and dies.

Cast
 Addison Randall as Jack Winters, aka Cherokee
 Frank Yaconelli as Lopez 
 Joyce Bryant as Mary Masters 
 Hal Price as Buckskin 
 Dennis Moore as Jimmy Winters, aka The Kansas Kid 
 Glenn Strange as Jeff Masters 
 Bob Card as Buff Gordon 
 Bud Osborne as Henchman Lex 
 Monte Rawlins as Henchman Rip
 Wylie Grant as Henchman Rawhide

References

External links
 
 
 

1939 films
American black-and-white films
Films shot in Lone Pine, California
Films directed by Spencer Gordon Bennet
Monogram Pictures films
1939 Western (genre) films
American Western (genre) films
1930s English-language films
1930s American films